Big Day Out 03 is an Australian compilation album released to coincide with the Big Day Out music festival in 2003.

Track listing

Disc one
The One - Foo Fighters
This Wicked Tongue - PJ Harvey
Get Free - The Vines
Cut Your Ribbon - Sparta
What Would You Do - The Living End
Set It Off - Resin Dogs
Karma - 1200 Techniques
Multiply - Xzibit
Take Me To Broadway - Gonzales
Bucket Bong - Frenzal Rhomb
Bleed American (live) - Jimmy Eat World
Man or Mouse - Millencolin
The People - The Music
Pussy Town - Machine Gun Fellatio
La La Land (Poxy Music v Kid Kenobi Remix) - Green Velvet
The Robots - Kraftwerk

Disc two
Two Months Off - Underworld
No One Knows - Queens of the Stone Age
In Love - The Datsuns
Nosebleed - The Hard Ons
Dead In Hollywood - Murderdolls
Change (In The House of Flies) - Deftones
Nil By Mouth - Blindspott
Fashion Rules! - Chicks on Speed
Rising Sun - Bexta
Stars and Heroes - Luke Slater
One Robot - Rocket Science
This Train Will Be Taking No Passengers - Augie March
Heavy Metal Drummer - Wilco
Lucky - Waikiki
N.D.C. - Jebediah
Bulletproof - Pacifier
What's The Deal? - 28 Days
London Still - The Waifs
Jane Says - Jane's Addiction

Music festival compilation albums
Compilation albums by New Zealand artists
2003 live albums
2003 compilation albums